Manilkara dardanoi is a tree species in the sapodilla family. It is endemic to Brazil, and only found in a small portion of Pernambuco. Here it grows in forests mostly along the coast, or elsewhere deeper inland where there is old secondary forest. Its natural habitat is gradually disappearing as forest is felled and land is cleared for human settlement.

References

dardanoi
Plants described in 1950
Flora of Brazil
Taxonomy articles created by Polbot
Taxa named by Adolpho Ducke

Critically endangered flora of Asia